Rosa Luxemburg (5 March 1871 – 15 January 1919) was a Marxist theorist, philosopher, economist and revolutionary socialist. In 1915, after the Social Democratic Party of Germany supported German involvement in World War I, she and Karl Liebknecht co-founded the anti-war Spartakusbund ("Spartacus League"), which eventually became the Communist Party of Germany (KPD).

This is a Rosa Luxemburg bibliography, including writings, speeches, letters and others.

Writings 

This is a list of selected writings:

Speeches

See also 

 Marxist bibliography

References

External links 
 Rosa Luxemburg at the Marxists Internet Archive

 
Luxemburg, Rosa
Communist books